Estonia competed at the 2008 Summer Olympics in Beijing, People's Republic of China. This is a list of the results of all Estonian athletes who qualified for the Olympics and were nominated by Estonian Olympic Committee. Estonia was represented in the 2008 Beijing Olympic Games by 47 athletes in total of 13 different sporting events. The Estonian delegation, the largest in the nation's Olympic history, marched into the Beijing National Olympic stadium as the 160th nation, before Haiti and after Ireland delegations during the opening ceremony.

Jüri Jaanson, who competed at his sixth Olympics, was the oldest and most experienced team member, and became Estonia's oldest Olympic medal winner with the age of 42 years, 10 months and two days.

Medalists

Athletics

Men
Track & road events

Field events

Combined events – Decathlon

Women
Field events

Combined events – Heptathlon

* The athlete who finished in second place, Lyudmila Blonska of the Ukraine, tested positive for a banned substance. Both the A and the B tests were positive, therefore Blonska was stripped of her silver medal, and Kand moved up a position.

Badminton

Estonia had qualified two berths in men's and women's badminton events.

Cycling

Road
Estonia had qualified three quota places in road cycling. For the first time in Olympic history, it also sent its first female road cyclist. Rein Taaramäe, who finished seventeenth in men's road race, achieved the best result for the nation's sport.

Track
Sprint

Fencing

Men

Gymnastics

Rhythmic

Judo

Rowing

Men

Qualification Legend: FA=Final A (medal); FB=Final B (non-medal); FC=Final C (non-medal); FD=Final D (non-medal); FE=Final E (non-medal); FF=Final F (non-medal); SA/B=Semifinals A/B; SC/D=Semifinals C/D; SE/F=Semifinals E/F; QF=Quarterfinals; R=Repechage

Sailing

Men

M = Medal race; EL = Eliminated – did not advance into the medal race; CAN = Race cancelled

Shooting

Men

Swimming

Men

Women

Tennis

Triathlon

Volleyball

Beach

See also
 Estonia at the 2008 Summer Paralympics

References

External links
EOK – Peking 2008 
Qualification by 17 June 2008.  
Delfi.ee Peking 2008 Estonian Olympic news and competitors.  
Gallery of the 2008 Estonian Olympic Team outfit presentation by Nike 
Image of the two times Olympic champion Erika Salumäe wearing 2008 Estonian Olympic Team outfit
Baltic athletes get ready to reach for Olympic gold The Baltic Times

Nations at the 2008 Summer Olympics
2008
2008 in Estonian sport